Témiscouata-sur-le-Lac is a municipality in Quebec, Canada, situated in the MRC of Témiscouata in the Bas-Saint-Laurent region. The city was created on May 5, 2010 from the mergers of the city of Cabano and Notre-Dame-du-Lac. The new city was called Cabano–Notre-Dame-du-Lac until November 13, 2010.

This region is part of traditional Maliseet territory.

Geography 
Témiscouata-sur-le-Lac is situated on the south side of the Saint Lawrence River, at about 260 km from Québec City, and 470 km west of Gaspé. The cities of importance close to Témiscouata-sur-le-Lac are Rivière-du-Loup, at 60 km to the north-west, Trois-Pistoles at 65 km to the north, Rimouski at 110 km north-east, and Edmundston in New Brunswick, at 60 km to the south-west. Témiscouata-sur-le-Lac is situated at 40 km to the north-west of the border with New Brunswick on Route 185.

The city of Témiscouata-sur-le-Lac is composed of two sectors: Cabano and Notre-Dame-du-Lac. There are also two small communities as well: Rivière-Creuse and Route-du-Sault.

Témiscouata-sur-le-Lac is situated on Lake Témiscouata which extends for 45 km. It is the second lake of importance on the Saint Lawrence River.

History 
On May 5, 2010, the cities of Cabano and Notre-Dame-du-Lac merged to form the city of Cabano–Notre-Dame-du-Lac, which was later named Témiscouata-sur-le-Lac.  The name was approved by more than 60% of the population during a referendum on June 20, 2010, and approved by the Minister of Municipal Affairs. The mayors of the cities of Cabano and Notre-Dame-du-Lac shared the role of mayor until June 10, 2010 when Gilles Garon was elected new mayor of the city.

Demographics 

Tourism 
Fort Ingall is a museum which is a reconstruction of the British fort built during the 19th century.

Lake Témiscouata is an ideal location for all kinds of nautical activities including fishing.

Notable people 
Paul Triquet is a well known recipient of the Victoria Cross, the highest honour for serving in the armies of the Commonwealth, native of Témiscouata-sur-le-Lac.

See also
 List of cities in Quebec

References

External links

Cities and towns in Quebec
Incorporated places in Bas-Saint-Laurent